Jose Luis Mejia Huaman (born 1969) is a Peruvian writer. He was born in Lima, Peru in 1969 and currently lives in Singapore, teaching Spanish to students at the Singapore American School.

He received a Bachelor's degree in Law and Political sciences from the National University of San Marcos, and he concluded his doctorate studies at the same university. He also studied at the Pontifical Catholic University of Peru, where he received a Bachelor's degree of Education.

Since 1993 his poetry has been published in many newspapers and specialized magazines in countries such as, Peru, Chile, United States, Argentina, Spain, México, Uruguay, Colombia, Brazil, Puerto Rico and France. As well as having edited several Spanish American anthologies, he has also published several books.

Books for children and adolescents 
San Martín y la bandera[San Martín and the flag] (Lima, yellow series, Grupo Santillana, 2020; 56 pages.  )
Sol y Mar nos cuentan: Romeo y Julieta[Sol and Mar tell us: Romeo and Juliet] (Lima, Loqueleo - Santillana, 2019; 168 pages. )
Segundo tiempo[Second half] (Lima, Planeta, Planetalector, 2017; 128 pages.  )
¡Es la buena educación![It's the good education!] (Lima, Santillana Group, 2014; as part of the educational series "Teo and his friends", for 3 year olds)
¡A la selva, de paseo![To the jungle, on a trip!] (Lima, Santillana Group, 2014; as part of the educational series "Teo and his friends", for 4 year olds)
Cuando sea grande yo[When I grow up] (Lima, Santillana Group, 2014; as part of the educational series "Teo and his friends", for 5 year olds )
Josefa y el movimiento[Josefa and the movement] (Lima, Santillana Group, discover series, illustrations by Ximena Castro, 2010; 38 pages.  )
Josefa y, ¿quién dijo miedo?[Josefa and, who said fear?] (Lima, Santillana Group,  discover series, illustrations by Ximena Castro, 2010; 34 pages. )
¿Hay alguien allí? [Is someone there?] (Lima, Santillana Group, cuenta cosas series, 2010; 276 pages. )
Josefa y los tamaños[Josefa and the sizes] (Lima, Santillana Group, discover series, illustrations by Natalia Vásquez, 2009; 34 pages.  )
Josefa y los opuestos[Josefa and the opposites] (Lima, Santillana Group, discover series, illustrations by Ximena Castro, 2009; 34 pages.  )
Fernanda y los colores[Fernanda and the colors] (Lima, Santillana Group discover series, illustrations by Kike Riesco, 2009; 34 pages.  )
Benjamín y las formas[Benjamin and the shapes] (Lima, Santillana Group, discover series, illustrations by Kike Riesco, 2009; 34 pages. )
Don Hilario y sus mascotas[Don Hilario and his pets] (Lima, Santillana Group, cuenta cosas series, illustrations by Ximena Castro, 2008; 55 pages. )
Imperial[Imperial] (Lima, Santillana, read series, 2008; 103 pages.  )
Se nos perdió el alfabeto [We lost the alphabet] (Lima, Santillana Group, cuenta cosas series, illustrations by Ximena Castro, 2007; 49 pages. )
Cuídate, Claudia, cuando estés conmigo [Be careful, Claudia, when you meet me] (Lima, Alfaguara-Grupo Santillana, red series, 2007; 225 pages. )
Un tal Pedro [A certain Pedro] (Bogotá, Norma editorial, “Torre de papel” Collection, yellow series, illustrations by Carmen Garcia, 2006; 80 pages. )
Cartas a María Elena [Letters to Maria Elena] (Lima, Alfaguara-Grupo Santillana, red series, 2006; 183 pages. )
Números –para empezar a contar– [Numbers. To start counting] (Lima, Santillana Group, cuenta cosas series, illustrations by Ximena Castro, 2005; 38 pages., first re-printing, 2008)
La granja de don Hilario [Don Hilario’s farm] (Lima, Santillana Group, cuenta cosas series, illustrations by Ximena Castro, 2004; 48 pages., first re-printing, 2005; second re-printing, 2006; third re-printing, 2007)

Poetry books 
50/50 [50/50] (Lima-Singapur, 2022; 120 pages. Legal Deposit National Library of Peru Catalogue# 2022-02653).
Nuevamente, corazón[Again, heart] (Lima-Singapur, 2018; 56 pages. Legal Deposit National Library of Peru Catalogue# 2018-07245).
NADIE en menos de cuarenta[NO ONE in less than forty] (Lima-Singapore, Kindle Edition, 2016; 164 pages.).
Esperando al elefante[Waiting for the elephant] (Lima-Singapur,  Nova Print editions, 2015; 179 pages. Legal Deposit National Library of Peru Catalogue# 2015-07268).
Décimas Cosas[Tenth Things] (Lima, grupo editorial Mesa Redonda, 2014; 104 pages.  ).
Morir acaba en tu vientre[Death ceases in your womb] (Bilingual edition (traducción al inglés de Jorge Milán) Lima, Poetas En Busca de Editor editions, 2011; 157 pages.  Legal Deposit National Library of Peru Catalogue# 2011-07320).
Sólo Sonetos Solos [Only Sonnets on their Own] (Santiago, Fuego de la Poesía Group, 2004; 144pp.)
Tal vez una primavera [Perhaps a spring] (Lima, Poetas en Busca de editor editions, 2002; 104 pages. Legal Deposit  National Library of Peru Catalogue# 1501162002-5872)
Para Atrapar Una Luciérnaga Amarilla [To Catch a Yellow Firefly] (Lima, Poetas En Busca de Editor editions, 1998; 87 pages. ).

External links 
 Jose Luis Mejia´s web page

Noticias (in Spanish)
 Escritor peruano José Luis Mejía publica su poemario “50/50” desde Singapur  14 de Junio,2022.
 José Luis Mejía publica nuevo libro de décimas  11 de Junio,2015.
 Esperando al Elefante: Décimas de José Luis Mejía  08 de Junio,2015.
 José Luis Mejía – Poems made for Life  01 de Febrero,2013.

Conferencias (in Spanish)
 Presentación del Poemario "50/50"  21 de Junio,2022.
 Conversatorio con colegio Fanning, Cartas a María Elena  22 de Mayo,2017.
 Exposición Literaria a los alumnos de 4to y 5to de secundaria.  1 de Junio,2015.
 Videoconferencia con el escritor José Luis Mejía  22 de Mayo,2013.

Entrevista (in Spanish)
 Erica de la O presenta al Poeta José Luis Mejía - Poemario 50/50  08 de Julio,2022.
 Entrevista al poeta-educador José Luis Mejía por Erica de la O - Master Coach  09 de Octubre,2020.
 Entrevista a José Luis Mejía - Loqueleo  29 de Abril,2020.
 Entrevista con Renato Cisneros  2015.
 Poesía peruana desde Indonesia  21 de Marzo,2013.
 Poeta José Luis Mejía: La inspiración trasciende al género  19 de Marzo,2013.
 Programa Voces: El microrrelato en América Latina  Octubre,2010.
 Don Hilario y José Luis Mejía - llevando el campo a la ciudad  24 de Julio,2008.

Blogs (in Spanish)
 Desde la isla de Java
 El Entrometido
 Desde Texoco
 Exilio dorado
 Solo sonetos solos
 Cosas que pasan por estos lares
 Crónicas desde Lima

Peruvian male writers
Living people
1969 births